Vespa vivax is a species of hornet that was described by Smith in 1870. Vespa vivax belongs to the genus group, Vespa, and to the family, Vespidae. It can be found across several countries in Asia, including India, Nepal, Myanmar, Thailand, China (Sichuan, Yunnan, Tibet) and Taiwan.

References 

Vespidae
Insects described in 1870
Hymenoptera of Asia